Bušinec is a small settlement in the Municipality of Dolenjske Toplice in Slovenia. The area is part of the historical region of Lower Carniola. The municipality is now included in the Southeast Slovenia Statistical Region.

History
A prehistoric settlement has been discovered at sites in the upper and lower parts of the settlement. The two hamlets of the village—Dolnji Bušinec and Gornji Bušinec—were formerly separate villages.

References

External links
Bušinec on Geopedia

Populated places in the Municipality of Dolenjske Toplice